The City of Cape Town, South Africa has numerous nature reserves within the city limits.

City of Cape Town 
The City of Cape Town manages the following nature reserves in the Cape Town metropolitan area:

Temp
North region

 
 
 
 
 
 
 

South region

 
 
 
 
 
 
 
 
 
 
 
 

Central region
 
 
 
 

East region

CapeNature 
CapeNature, the Western Cape provincial conservation authority, manages Driftsands Nature Reserve on the Cape Flats, and the eastern part of the Kogelberg Nature Reserve. A small area of the Hottentots-Holland Nature Reserve also falls within the city limits of Cape Town.

South African National Parks (SANParks) 
South African National Parks (SANParks) manages the following nature reserve in Cape Town:
 Table Mountain National Park

Eskom 
Eskom manages the following nature reserve in Cape Town:
 Koeberg Nature Reserve

University of the Western Cape (UWC) 
The University of the Western Cape (UWC) manages the following nature reserve in Cape Town:
 Cape Flats Nature Reserve

See also

References

External links 
 

 01
Nature reserves
Natural history of Cape Town

Nature reserves in Cape Town
Tourist attractions in Cape Town
nature reserves in Cape Town